Al-Tha'lah is a Syrian village in As-Suwayda District in As-Suwayda Governorate. According to the Syria Central Bureau of Statistics (CBS), Al-Tha'lah had a population of 4,569 in the 2004 census.

History
In 1596, Al-Tha'lah appeared in the Ottoman tax registers  as Ta'la; part of the nahiya of Bani Nasiyya in the Hauran Sanjak. It had an entirely Muslim population consisting of 30 households and 12 bachelors. The villagers paid a fixed tax rate of 25% on various agricultural products, including   wheat (10500 akçe), barley (2250), summer crops (1500), goats and beehives (500), in addition to "occasional revenues"(250);  a total of 15,000  akçe.

In 1838, it  was noted as a Sunni Muslim village,  situated "the Nukra, east of Al-Shaykh Maskin".

References

Bibliography

External links
El Karak-map; 21m

Populated places in as-Suwayda District
Villages in Syria